A constitutional referendum was held in Tunisia on 5 May 1946 as part of the wider French constitutional referendum. The new constitution was rejected by 64% of voters in Tunisia and 53% of voters overall. Voter turnout was 59.2%.

Results

References

1946 referendums
May 1946 events in Africa
1946 in Tunisia
1946 1